is Kotoko's tenth maxi single under Geneon Entertainment, released on December 19, 2007. The title track was used as the theme song for the Japanese science fiction thriller movie of the same title, launched in Japan in 2008, starring Takuya Ishida and Mitsuki Tanimura. Real onigokko means "real tag game" in English. The single peaked at the #15 position in the Oricon charts selling 7,588 units in its first week of release.

Track listing
リアル鬼ごっこ / Real Onigokko—6:39
Composition: Kazuya Takase
Arrangement: Kazuya Takase
Lyrics: Kotoko
Siren - 5:40
Composition: Kazuya Takase
Arrangement: Kazuya Takase
Lyrics: Kotoko
リアル鬼ごっこ / Real Onigokko (Instrumental) -- 6:39
Siren (Instrumental) -- 5:39

Charts and sales

References

2007 singles
Kotoko (singer) songs
Song recordings produced by I've Sound
Songs with lyrics by Kotoko (musician)
2007 songs
Japanese film songs